SATIS or Station Area Traffic Improvement Scheme, is a traffic improvement project in Mumbai, India.

Satis or SATIS may also refer to:

 Satis (goddess) AKA Satet, the cult of deification of the floods of the Nile River in Egyptian mythology
 Satis (inhabited locality), name of several inhabited localities in Russia
 Satis (river), a river in Russia
 Satis House, a fictional estate in the Charles Dickens novel Great Expectations
 Renault Vel Satis, a French executive car
 Sports Association of Tasmanian Independent Schools (SATIS), a group of schools in Tasmania, Australia formed to conduct sporting competitions
 SATIS Expo, an annual Francophone trade show for broadcasters
 Satis (Wikt), a Latin phrase, often used in literary English, meaning "Enough!"

See also
 Sati (disambiguation)